Juszczyna  is a village in the administrative district of Gmina Radziechowy-Wieprz, within Żywiec County, Silesian Voivodeship, in southern Poland.

The village has an approximate population of 1,700.

The wooden Visitation of the Blessed Virgin Mary church was built in 1922 to commemorate the 21 people who perished in the flash flood of 16 July 1908.

References

 http://www.grojcowianie.org/index.php?option=com_content&task=view&id=132&Itemid=44

Villages in Żywiec County